Novak Djokovic was the three-time defending champion, but lost in the semifinals to Andy Murray.Roger Federer won his fifth Dubai title, defeating Murray 7–5, 6–4 in the final. He did not lose a single set in the entire tournament.

Seeds

Draw

Finals

Top half

Bottom half

Qualifying

Seeds

Qualifiers

Draw

First qualifier

Second qualifier

Third qualifier

Fourth qualifier

References
 Main Draw
 Qualifying Draw
 Dubai Duty Free Tennis Championships

Dubai Tennis Championships - Singles
2012 Dubai Tennis Championships